Pandeli Evangjeli (6 January 1859 – 14 September 1949) was an Albanian politician who served two terms as the 7th Prime Minister of Albania. He was the first Orthodox Christian to head the Albanian government.

Early life and career 
Born in Korçë in 1859, he spent most of his youth in the Albania colony of Bucharest. He became chairman of the society "Dituria" ("Knowledge") in 1897, and contributed in the establishment of a local "Committee for the Liberation of Albania", one of the many of that time. He became prefect of his native city in 1914 after returning from Romania.

Prime Minister of Albania 
As part of the government of Sulejman Delvina, he was soon part of the Albanian delegation in the Paris Peace Conference in 1920. He was then elected a member of the parliament, then Prime Minister from 16 October 1921 to 5 December 1921. From 1922 to 1924 he was Foreign Minister. 

During Fan Noli's tenure after the June Revolution he exiled in Romania, returning in 1925 when he was elected Head of the Senate. As a representative of Korça, he headed the session that proclaimed Albania as a Constitutional Monarchy and Ahmet Zogu as King of Albania. A strong supporter of Zog, he directed three cabinets as Prime Minister from 1930 to 1935. He was replaced by Mehdi Frashëri after he was criticized for "failing to maintain peace and order" during the Revolt of Fier in 1935. He served as Parliamentary President until the Italian invasion of 1939.

Although he was considered a pro-Italian, and his name appears in the Assembly list of 1943, he did not play an active role during World War II and the communist regime did not persecute him.

Death 
Evangjeli died in Korçë in 1949.

See also
 History of Albania
 List of prime ministers of Albania

References

1859 births
1949 deaths
People from Korçë
People from Manastir vilayet
Eastern Orthodox Christians from Albania
Members of the Albanian Orthodox Church
Foreign ministers of Albania
Prime Ministers of Albania
Albanian diplomats
Albanian monarchists
Albanian expatriates in Romania
Activists of the Albanian National Awakening
Speakers of the Parliament of Albania
Members of the Parliament of Albania